Kramer Austin Hickok (born April 14, 1992) is an American professional golfer who currently plays on the PGA Tour. He previously played on the Web.com Tour and PGA Tour Canada. He was PGA Tour Canada's player of the year in 2017.

Early life and education
Kramer Austin Hickok was born on April 14, 1992. He attended the University of Texas and was a freshman the same year as Jordan Spieth. He roomed with Spieth during the university's national championship season in 2011–12 and later caddied for him at the 2011 AT&T Byron Nelson. He played four years for the Longhorns, earning a degree in Geography in 2015.

Career
Hickok turned professional after his 2015 season at the University of Texas. His first tournament was the Panama Championship where he finished tied for 64th place.
  
Hickok played on the PGA Tour Canada in 2017 where he earned player of the year honors, winning twice during the season; The Players Cup and the Ontario Championship. He was also the Order of Merit winner for the 2017 season.

Hickok played on the Web.com Tour in 2018 and finished the regular season inside the top 25 of the money list, earning his PGA Tour card for the 2018–19 season. During the Web.com Tour Finals, he won the DAP Championship, defeating Hunter Mahan and Matt Jones by three strokes. He went wire-to-wire for the tournament, and matched the course record with a single round of 63 on the first day.

In June 2021, Hickok tied for the lead of the Travelers Championship after 72 holes. He ultimately lost to Harris English, who made a birdie on the eighth playoff hole. It was the second longest playoff in PGA Tour history.

Professional wins (3)

Web.com Tour wins (1)

PGA Tour Canada wins (2)

Playoff record
PGA Tour playoff record (0–1)

Results in major championships

"T" = tied

Results in The Players Championship

"T" indicates a tie for a place

Team appearances
Professional
Aruba Cup (representing PGA Tour Canada): 2017 (winners)

See also
2018 Web.com Tour Finals graduates
2019 Korn Ferry Tour Finals graduates

References

External links
 
 

American male golfers
Texas Longhorns men's golfers
PGA Tour golfers
Korn Ferry Tour graduates
Golfers from Austin, Texas
Golfers from Dallas
1992 births
Living people